The Dean of Jersey is the leader of the Church of England in Jersey. He is ex officio a member of the States of Jersey, although since the constitutional reforms of 1948 the Dean may not take part in parliamentary votes. The Dean acts as the chaplain of the States Assembly and may speak in debates on any matter.

The Dean is appointed by the Crown by means of letters patent and sworn into that office by Jersey's Royal Court. The Dean also serves as rector of one of the Parishes of Jersey and is instituted and inducted in that office by the Bishop of Winchester.  Since 1784 it has been customary (but not obligatory) for the Dean to also be the rector of the Parish Church of St Helier, but this has not always been the case. For example, William Corbet Le Breton, father of Lillie Langtry, was rector of Saint Saviour at the time he became Dean, though transferred to St Helier in 1875.

Since 1661, the Dean of Jersey has a seal of pointed ellipse type. The arms of the deanery impale those of each individual (or alternatively a monogram).

The Dean of Jersey presides over the ecclesiastical court.

List of deans

See also
 Dean of Guernsey

References

Bibliography
Customs, Ceremonies & Traditions of the Channel Islands, Lemprière, 1976,

External links

The Channel Islands on Diocese of Winchester

Jersey clergy
Jersey
Parochial politics of Jersey
Jersey
Christianity in Jersey
Members of the States of Jersey
Deans of Jersey
1620 establishments in the British Empire